The 1978 British Grand Prix (formally the XXXI John Player British Grand Prix) was a Formula One motor race held at Brands Hatch on 16 July 1978. It was the tenth race of the 1978 World Championship of F1 Drivers and the 1978 International Cup for F1 Constructors.

The 76-lap race was won by Argentinian driver Carlos Reutemann, driving a Ferrari. After starting from eighth position, Reutemann worked his way up the field and took the lead on lap 60, eventually winning by 1.2 seconds from Austrian driver Niki Lauda in the Brabham-Alfa Romeo. Lauda's Northern Irish teammate, John Watson, finished third.

Report

Qualifying
With a total of 31 cars on the entry list, it was decided to forbid the Martini of René Arnoux from taking part, thus leaving 30 cars for qualifying.

As expected, the Lotuses filled the front row of the grid, although on this occasion Ronnie Peterson was ahead of Mario Andretti. Jody Scheckter in the Wolf and Niki Lauda in the Brabham made up the second row, while on the third were Riccardo Patrese in the Arrows and Alan Jones in the Williams. The top ten was completed by Jacques Laffite in the Ligier, Carlos Reutemann in the Ferrari, John Watson in the second Brabham and Patrick Depailler in the Tyrrell.

Race
At the start of the race, Andretti took the lead from Peterson, with Scheckter holding third and Jones moving up to fourth. The Lotuses quickly pulled out a large gap, and looked set to dominate, until Peterson retired on lap 7 with a fuel leak. Andretti continued to lead until a puncture forced him to pit on lap 24, before his engine failed five laps later.

Scheckter inherited the lead, closely followed by Jones, Lauda and Patrese. On lap 27, Jones's driveshaft failed, before Scheckter began to suffer gearbox problems. On lap 34, Lauda overtook the South African, who retired three laps later. This left Patrese in second, with Reutemann up to third, Watson fourth, Didier Pironi fifth in the second Tyrrell and Keke Rosberg sixth in the ATS.

On lap 41, Patrese suffered a rear puncture which led to a suspension failure. Pironi also retired on this lap with gearbox trouble, promoting Rosberg to fourth. The Finn soon came under pressure from Depailler, who got by on lap 49.

Reutemann closed up to Lauda and passed him for the lead on lap 60, as the two were lapping the McLaren of Bruno Giacomelli. The Argentine held off the Austrian for the remaining laps, eventually taking his third win of the season by 1.2 seconds. Watson finished 36 seconds behind Lauda and 36 ahead of Depailler, while a suspension failure for Rosberg on lap 60 meant that the final points went to Hans-Joachim Stuck in the Shadow and Patrick Tambay in the McLaren.

Classification

Qualifying

*Positions in red indicate entries that failed to qualify.

Race

Championship standings after the race

Drivers' Championship standings

Constructors' Championship standings

References

British Grand Prix
British Grand Prix
Grand Prix
British Grand Prix